John Noyes (April 2, 1764October 26, 1841) was an American politician. He served as a member of the United States House of Representatives from Vermont.

Biography
Noyes was born in Atkinson in the Province of New Hampshire to Humphrey Noyes and Elizabeth Little. He attended Phillips Exeter Academy and graduated from Dartmouth College in 1795, where he studied theology. After graduation, he worked as a tutor at Chesterfield Academy from 1795 until 1797, and at Dartmouth College from 1797 until 1799. One of the students he taught at Dartmouth was Daniel Webster, 14th and 19th United States Secretary of State.

In 1800 Noyes moved to Brattleboro, Vermont and focused on business pursuits. He was a member of the firm of "Noyes, Mann and Hayes", one of the earliest chain stores in America. The other members of the firm were Jonas Mann and Rutherford Hayes, Jr.

Noyes served as presidential elector Vermont in 1804. He was a member of the Vermont House of Representatives from 1808 until 1810. He was elected as a Federalist Representative to the Fourteenth Congress, serving from March 4, 1815 until March 3, 1817. After leaving Congress, Noyes moved to Dummerston, Vermont and lived there until 1822 when he moved his family to Putney, Vermont.

Family life
Noyes married Polly Hayes Noyes in September 1804 in West Brattleboro, Vermont. They had four children together, John Humphrey Noyes, Charlotte Augusta Noyes Miller, Harriet Hayes Noyes Skinner and George Washington Noyes. John Humphrey Noyes was an American utopian socialist who founded the Oneida Community in 1848.

Noyes was the uncle of President Rutherford B. Hayes by marriage on Hayes's father's side.

Death
Noyes retired in 1819, and died on October 26, 1841 at his farm near Putney, Vermont. He is interred at Maple Grove Cemetery in Putney.

References

External links 
 

 
 Rbhayes.org: Noyes Family
 govtrack.us: Rep. John Noyes
 The Political Graveyard: Noyes, John (1764–1841)

1764 births
1841 deaths
Dartmouth College alumni
Members of the Vermont House of Representatives
Burials in Vermont
American Presbyterians
Federalist Party members of the United States House of Representatives from Vermont
Phillips Exeter Academy alumni
People from Atkinson, New Hampshire
Noyes family
Hayes family